The Christmas That Almost Wasn't (original title, Il Natale che quasi non fu) is a 1966 American-Italian film that stars Rossano Brazzi and Paul Tripp, and was originally released by Childhood Productions Inc.

On television, the movie had traditional December airings on Home Box Office (HBO) during the 1970s and early 1980s.

Plot
Sam Whipple, a broke lawyer who is nevertheless young at heart, meets Santa Claus and learns that he is upset because he has a new landlord named Phineas T. Prune, to whom Santa owes a great deal of rent. Prune has threatened to confiscate Santa's toys and have him, Mrs. Claus and the elves evicted. In order to raise money, Sam and Santa get jobs at a department store, where working for two days will somehow earn enough money to pay all of the entire rent that is due. Santa is nervous at first, but when the children arrive, they naturally gravitate to him and he becomes a big success.

Prune schemes to thwart Sam and Santa's plans. He buys the department store, has his butler destroy several of the toys and takes the damages out of Santa and Sam's paychecks. He gloats that Santa will never be able to pay his rent on time.

Now broke again, Sam and Santa fear Christmas will be canceled. A little boy passes them on the street and asks them what is the matter. When Sam explains, the little boy calls out to the city's children to help Santa. All of the children pour into the streets and give what money they can . . . more than enough to pay all of the rent that is due.

Santa pays Prune his rent at the last minute. Then Santa, Mrs. Claus and Sam deliver the gifts together. They are surprised to discover that the very last gift is addressed to none other than Prune.

They arrive at Prune's home and Santa offers him the gift. He opens it and is moved to find that it is the toy sailboat that he had wanted as a boy. A letter from Santa's head elf apologizes for the clerical error that resulted in Santa never visiting him as a child. Prune rediscovers his holiday spirit and runs into the street wishing everyone a merry Christmas, bewildering the townsfolk with his enthusiasm. As Santa and Mrs. Claus depart, he thanks Sam for all his help.

Prune generously gives his sailboat to a little boy as the town's children look on with delight. He invites all of them to his mansion for a Christmas party.

Main cast
 Rossano Brazzi as Phineas T. Prune
 Paul Tripp as Sam Whipple
 Alberto Rabagliati as Santa Claus
 Lydia Brazzi as Mrs. Santa Claus
 Mischa Auer as Jonathan, the elf foreman
 Sonny Fox as Mr. Prim
 John Karlsen as Blossom

Production
The film was directed by and stars Rossano Brazzi. The actual story was based on the book written by Paul Tripp, who also adapted it for the screen and stars in the film. The musical score was written by Bruno Nicolai, which includes the title song sung by Glenn Yarbrough. In the United States, the film is rated G and has a running time of 89 minutes.

Home media

DVD
The film was released on DVD on October 7, 2003, to Region 1. It is the unedited 93-minute version.

Streaming
The Christmas That Almost Wasn't was made available for streaming through Netflix, Amazon Video, and Peacock.

References in other media
In The Simpsons episode "Skinner's Sense of Snow" (2000), Principal Seymour Skinner shows a film called The Christmas That Almost Wasn't, But Then Was.

This film was riffed in the 11th season of Mystery Science Theater 3000.

See also
 List of Christmas films
 Santa Claus in film

References

External links
 
 
 

1966 films
1966 comedy-drama films
1960s American films
1960s Italian films
1960s English-language films
American Christmas comedy-drama films
American children's fantasy films
Italian Christmas comedy-drama films
Italian children's films
Italian fantasy films
English-language Italian films
Films scored by Bruno Nicolai
Santa Claus in film